Homogeneity is a sameness of constituent structure.

Homogeneity, homogeneous, or homogenization may also refer to:

In mathematics 
Transcendental law of homogeneity of Leibniz
 Homogeneous space for a Lie group G, or more general transformation group
 Homogeneous function
 Homogeneous polynomial
 Homogeneous equation (linear algebra): systems of linear equations with zero constant term
 Homogeneous differential equation
 Homogeneous distribution
 Homogeneous linear transformation
 Homogeneous relation: binary relation on a set
 Asymptotic homogenization, a method to study partial differential equations with highly oscillatory coefficients
 Homogenization of a polynomial, a mathematical operation
 Homogeneous (large cardinal property)
 Homogeneous coordinates, used in projective spaces
 Homogeneous element and homogeneous ideal in a graded ring
 Homogeneous model in model theory

In statistics 
 Homogeneity (statistics), logically consistent data matrices
 Homogeneity of variance

In chemistry 
 Homogeneous catalysis, a sequence of chemical reactions that involve a catalyst in the same phase as the reactants
 Homogeneous (chemistry), a property of a mixture showing no variation in properties
 Homogenization (chemistry), intensive mixing of mutually insoluble substance or groups of substance to obtain a soluble suspension or constant

Other uses
 Homogeneity (physics), translational invariance or compatibility of units in equations
 Homogenization (climate), the process of removing non-climatic changes from climate data
 Homogenization (biology), a process that involves breaking apart cells — releasing organelles and cytoplasm
 Homogeneity (ecology), all of the same or similar kind or nature
 Milk#Creaming and homogenization, to prevent separation of the cream
Heterogeneity (disambiguation), links relating to objects or systems consisting of multiple items having a large number of structural variations
Monoculturalism, ethnic homogeneity or the advocacy of it
Zygosity

See also